Zhang County or Zhangxian is a county in Gansu province of the People's Republic of China. It is under the administration of the prefecture-level city of Dingxi. Its postal code is 748300, and its population in 2017 was 198,200 people.

The county has several mineral resources such as rock salt, limestone and andalusite.

Administrative divisions
Zhang County is divided to 10 towns and 3 townships.
Towns

Townships
 Maquan Township()
 Wudang Township()
 Dongquan Township()

Climate

See also
 List of administrative divisions of Gansu

References

  Official website (Chinese)

Zhang County
Dingxi